A Simple Trick to Happiness is a 2020 studio album by American singer-songwriter Lisa Loeb, released on February 28, 2020. The album is Loeb's most personal and reflects her interest in simple and direct songwriting paired with inspiration from her children and personal life. Loeb was inspired to write positive, uplifting music due to the complexity of modern life and after having written several albums of children's music. The album was preceded by a music video for "Skeleton" in December 2019.

Produced by Loeb and Rich Jacques, A Simple Trick to Happiness is a snapshot that examines life as a mother, wife, artist, and businesswoman seeking to find that rare perfect balance between personal fulfillment and purpose. The album features 11 original songs, co-written with Jacques, Scott Effman, Rosi Golan, Eric Lumiere, and others. The first track "Doesn't It Feel Good" features Michelle Branch on backing vocals.

Promotion
In October 2019, Loeb preceded the album's release with the premiere of her single "Sing Out" on the largest LGBTQ news site Queerty, in honor of National Coming Out Day. In December 2019, she premiered the music video for "Skeleton," the first official single from the album. In February 2020, she did a wide-ranging interview with entertainment and pop culture journalist and Editor-in-Chief of Yahoo! Music Lyndsey Parker, speaking at-length about the inspiration for the album. Loeb also performed an intimate live concert and signed copies of her albums for fans during a special in-store event at Amoeba Records in Hollywood.

She has subsequently released music videos for many of the tracks on the album, including "This Is My Life," "Another Day," "Sing Out," "For The Birch," "Shine," and "The Upside."

In March 2020, Loeb launched #StayAtHomeTogether, a series of live virtual concerts during the COVID-19 pandemic lockdown. She also performed a special virtual show for hospital frontline workers through the organization Musicians On Call.

In April 2020, Loeb partnered with Crayola for a virtual nursery rhyme "Color & Sing Along," taking place three days a week for a month.

Critical reception
The album was met by positive reviews and praise from critics and fans. The week of the release, Loeb became the #1 trending news story on Yahoo. The editorial staff of AllMusic gave the album four out of five stars, with reviewer Mark Deming calling it, "one of the best and most satisfying albums Lisa Loeb has made to date".

Track listing

Personnel
Lisa Loeb – art direction, banjo, guitar, production, vocals

Additional musicians
Michelle Branch – backing vocals
Yoshi Breen – piano
Scott Effman – guitar, ukulele, backing vocals
Kyler England – backing vocals
Vanessa Freebairn-Smith – cello
Rich Jacques – bass guitar, drum programming, engineering, guitar, Mellotron, organ, piano, production, programming, synthesizer, ukulele, backing vocals
Bill Lefler – snare drums, percussion
Adam Levy – guitar
Kevin Scott Rhoads – engineering, piano
Anna Schulze – backing vocals
Kazumi Shimokawa – bass guitar, keyboards, Mellotron, piano, ukulele
Blair Sinta – drums, engineering

Technical personnel
Hans Dekline – mastering
Craig Frank – engineering
Richard Furch – mixing
Juan Patino – cover photo
Marc Whitmore – engineering
Janet Wolsborn – art direction
Brian Yaskulka – mixing

See also
List of 2020 albums

References

External links

Long-form interview on Loeb's career in advance of the album release by Yahoo! News
 
 

2020 albums
Lisa Loeb albums
Self-released albums